Fantastic Duo is a South Korean television show where fans can sing a duet with their favorite singer using their cell phones. This show is currently hosted by Jun Hyun-moo, Kim Bum-soo and Kim Jun-hyun. It airs on SBS every Sunday at 16:50 (KST) beginning April 17, 2016; forming part of SBS's Good Sunday lineup. There were 30 episodes aired during Season 1, which ended on November 20, 2016.

Season 2 broadcast every Sundays at 18:30 (KST) starting March 26, 2017, after Running Man. On October 26, Fantastic Duo production team announced that season 2 would be end after the last recording on November 7, whose the last regular episode was aired on December 10. A special episode titled "Fantastic Memory" was aired on December 17, 2017.

Format

Season 1
In each episode, 3–4 Korean singers will compete each other in order to find and be the "Fantastic Duo". Through the singing application "everySing", 5–10 runners-up from ordinary people were selected and from there, 3 contestants were selected and will appear in the show. The contestants later compete with each other in "1:3 Random Competition" (details below), where the singers would choose one of the 3 contestants to be his/her "Fantastic Duo". Later a final performance will be conducted, and the duo which received the highest votes out of 300 audiences will be crowned as the winner. The songs will be officially released as a single, and will be given the copyright that is protected by the Korean Law, and the copyright will be maintained for the next 70 years. To ensure for the contestants to earn the royalty, the broadcasting company, SBS, will register the contestants to the Federation of Korean Music Performers, where they will automatically given the privilege of a singer. The winning duo will earn $10,000 (Ten thousand dollars) for every win, with a maximum of five wins.

1:3 Random Competition
The 3 contestants will go up to the stage and will sing a singer's song. The contestants can only sing when their light comes up, with the light comes up randomly. The singer sing the song's first verse. After the performance ended, the singer will personally shut down the contestants light, the contestant with his/her light still comes up became the singers "Fantastic Duo"

In several episodes, there would be a "First Impression Medley" section which allows the singers to see the contestants abilities and help them to choose his/her duo.

Panelists
In every episode, there would be a group of panelists that act as co-hosts, judges and commentators which could help the singer to choose his/her duo.

Season 2
In season 2, the rules have been modified so now it features 2 (or 3) singers, each with their own panelists and sub-MC's in a team-styled match.

Episodes 1–6
Through the application "EverySing", 6 candidates will be chosen and from there, 3 contestants will appear in the show (for each singer). The last contestant (of the total of 7) is selected from those who already have appeared in the show whom the audience wants to see again.

The 7 contestants will face the preliminary round, 1:7 Match, where each singer have to choose 3 out of 7 contestants, regardless of which singer the contestants were auditioned for (For example, a contestant who auditioned for singer A can be chosen by singer B as his/her top 3). In cases that a contestant was chosen as the top 3 by both singers, the contestant will choose the singer themselves. The contestants who doesn't get chosen from both singers will be eliminated. The remaining contestants (for each singer) will go into the standard 1:3 Random Competition, where in the end the last remaining contestant will be his/her Fantastic Duo. The singer with their chosen contestants will go to the final round, where the duo with the most votes out of 200 will be the "Fantastic Duo".

Episodes 7–present
Through the application "EverySing", 8 candidates will be chosen, and from there, 5 contestants will appear in the show. The contestants will enter the 1:5 Match, where the singer will choose 3 out of 5 contestants. The contestants who doesn't get chosen from the singer will be eliminated. The remaining contestants will go into the standard 1:3 Random Competition where the last remaining contestant will be his/her Fantastic Duo. The singer with their chosen contestants will go to the final round, where the duo with the most votes out of 200 will be the "Fantastic Duo".

In the season finale of Fantastic Duo 2, "The King of the Kings" special, the winner will be given a sedan/car as a reward.

1:7 Match
All 7 contestants were revealed, either those who auditioned for the singer, the other singer, or the fan favorites from Season 1, will face the 1:7 Match. The rules are similar to the 1:3 Random Competition. 3 out of 7 contestants will be chosen by the singers to move on to the 1:3 Random Competition.

1:5 Match
All 5 contestants will face the 1:5 Match. The rules are similar to the 1:3 Random Competition. 3 out of 5 contestants will be chosen by the singers to move on to the 1:3 Random Competition.

In Season 2, the 1:3 Random Competition is slightly simplified, in which the singer would no longer needed to shut down the lights to choose his/her Fantastic Duo, but rather announcing his/her Fantastic Duo directly after a 5-second countdown.

Cast

Season 1

Host
Jun Hyun-moo
Kim Su-ro (Pilot)

Regular panelist
Yoon Sang
Park Myeong-su
Seo Jang-hoon
Jang Yun-jeong
Han Hee-jun

Season 2

Host
Jun Hyun-moo
Lee So-ra (Co-host, episodes 1–6)
Kim Bum-soo (Co-host/Panel team leader)
Kim Jun-hyun (Co-host/Panel team leader)

Regular panelist
Jang Yun-jeong
Bada
Yang Yo-seob (HIGHLIGHT)
DinDin
Kim Eana
Yoon Il-sang

List of guests and results ( Season 1 ) 
Note: the section labeled in gold is the winner

Season 1

List of Episodes

List of winners

Notes (Season 1)

List of guests and results ( Season 2 ) 
Note: the section labeled in gold is the winner

Season 2

List of Episodes

List of Finalists
 – The finalists participated in the Final Concert

Final Concert
Note: Only 9 of 18 finalists participated in the Final Concert whose King of Kings' Final MVP's participant received a car as prize. The voting time for King of Kings' Final MVP was effectuated after three main performances of each round, the last result was announced at the end of episode 36 without scores' publishing.

Fantastic Memory
This special episode was broadcast on December 17, 2017, included the director's cut and the highlights of both two seasons.

Notes (Season 2)
For the guests' first choices after the "random play" round (episodes 1–4), the participant with * after their name is the simultaneous choice of the guests, at this time that participant have the option of going to which guest's team they want.
The special participant is the previous episodes' participant but wasn't the singer's last choice, he/she will directly come to the "Random Competition" round not through selection like others.
Other notes:

Ratings

Season 1

Season 2

Awards and nominations

References

External links
 
Fantastic Duo season 1 on SBS official website 
 

2016 South Korean television series debuts
2017 South Korean television series endings
Korean-language television shows
Seoul Broadcasting System original programming
South Korean variety television shows
South Korean music television shows